Sandrine Ilendou (born November 19, 1983) is a Gabonese judoka, who played for the extra-lightweight category. She won the bronze medal for her category at the 2007 All-Africa Games in Algiers, Algeria, and silver at the 2011 All-Africa Games in Maputo, Mozambique, losing out to Tunisia's Amani Khalfaoui.

Ilendou represented Gabon at the 2008 Summer Olympics in Beijing, where she competed for the women's 48 kg class. She lost the first preliminary match to Algeria's Meriem Moussa, who was able to score a single yuko at the end of five-minute period.

References

External links

NBC 2008 Olympics profile

Gabonese female judoka
1983 births
Living people
Olympic judoka of Gabon
Judoka at the 2008 Summer Olympics
African Games silver medalists for Gabon
African Games bronze medalists for Gabon
African Games medalists in judo
Competitors at the 2007 All-Africa Games
Competitors at the 2011 All-Africa Games
21st-century Gabonese people